Dulcify (14 October 1975– 6 November 1979) was a New Zealand-bred Thoroughbred racehorse. His British-bred sire was the 1970 Irish 2,000 Guineas winner, Decies (GB), a grandson of Pharis (FR), the very important French sire whom Thoroughbred Heritage says is considered one of the greatest French-bred runners of the century.

Dulcify's dam was the Australian mare Sweet Candy (AUS), a daughter of 1957 Golden Slipper Stakes winner and Australian Racing Hall of Fame inductee Todman (AUS).

He was owned and raced by Colin Hayes, who purchased him for $3,250. Hayes called him the best horse he ever raced. 

A patient, come-from-behind runner, his most important career win came in the 1979 Cox Plate, which he won by a still-standing record of seven lengths.
The betting favourite for the 1979 Melbourne Cup, he suffered a broken pelvis during the race and had to be euthanized.

In 2014, he was inducted into the Australian Racing Hall of Fame.

References

 Dulcify at the Horse Directory Australia website
 Video biography of Dulcify at YouTube

External links
 Jenny Barnes Photography: Dulcify
 Dulcify's pedigree and partial racing stats

1975 racehorse births
1979 racehorse deaths
Cox Plate winners
 Victoria Derby winners
Horses who died from racing injuries
Racehorses bred in New Zealand
Racehorses trained in Australia
Australian Racing Hall of Fame horses
Thoroughbred family 3-e